is a Nippon Professional Baseball player for the Tohoku Rakuten Golden Eagles in Japan's Pacific League.

External links

Living people
1976 births
Baseball people from Miyazaki Prefecture
Japanese baseball players
Nippon Professional Baseball infielders
Tohoku Rakuten Golden Eagles players
Japanese baseball coaches
Nippon Professional Baseball coaches